Rolf Jonas Schön (born April 2, 1969 in Västerås) is a retired male ice speed skater from Sweden, who represented his native country in two consecutive Winter Olympics, starting in 1992 in Albertville, France. He mainly competed in the middle- and the long-distance events.

References

1969 births
Living people
Swedish male speed skaters
Speed skaters at the 1992 Winter Olympics
Speed skaters at the 1994 Winter Olympics
Olympic speed skaters of Sweden
Sportspeople from Västerås
20th-century Swedish people